Co-ownership is a legal concept in a business where two or more co-owners share the legal ownership of property. 

For the concept of co-ownership in different legal codes, see:

 Concurrent estate, for co-ownership in the common law system
 Co-ownership (association football), for co-ownership of a player in association football ( in Italy)

See also
 Capital participation
 Equity sharing
 Joint ownership (disambiguation)